Mixtape Messiah 7 is a mixtape by southern rapper Chamillionaire. It is also the final mixtape in the Mixtape Messiah series.  Disc 1 was mixed by Michael "5000" Watts and disc 2 was mixed by Rapic Ric. Chamillionaire later released a chopped and screwed version of various tracks from the album (disc 3), and also a regular speed version of the chopped and screwed CD (disc 4).

Release
On his official website, Mixtape Messiah 7 disc one was released on August 4, 2009. The second and third discs were released on August 6, and the final disc on August 7.

100 physical copies of the mixtape were given away to fans, these included Chamillionaire's signature, a 12-page booklet of artwork, and a $100 bill. Chamillionaire auctioned two of these copies on eBay, with all proceeds going to No More Victims, a Houston organization that gives aid to children of incarcerated parents.

Track listing

References

External links
 Mixtape Messiah 7 on Chamillionaire.com

Chamillitary Entertainment albums
Chamillionaire albums
2009 mixtape albums
Sequel albums